EA Sports UFC is a mixed martial arts fighting video game developed in a collaboration between EA Canada and SkyBox Labs, and published by EA Sports for PlayStation 4 and Xbox One. It is based on the Ultimate Fighting Championship (UFC) brand and was released on June 17, 2014. A playable demo was released on the PlayStation Network and Xbox Marketplace on June 3, 2014, with cover athletes Jon Jones and Alexander Gustafsson as playable fighters. It is the first UFC game since THQ sold the license to Electronic Arts.

A free-to-play mobile version of the game was released for iOS and Android devices on April 21, 2015. A sequel, EA Sports UFC 2, was released in March 2016. The third installment, EA Sports UFC 3, was released on February 2, 2018, and a fourth title, EA Sports UFC 4, was released on August 14, 2020.

Gameplay 
EA Sports UFC is a mixed martial arts fighting game based on the Ultimate Fighting Championship (UFC). Its artificial intelligence accommodates for changes in player strategies mid-game to make the gaming experience more realistic than in previous UFC games. The game also simulates "full body deformation" to connect players with their player-character. The Ultimate Fighter is featured at the start of Career Mode. Also included are perks unlocked throughout career to boost game-plans.

Development
Conflict originally arose between UFC president Dana White and Electronic Arts, when the UFC approached EA Sports to develop a UFC video game and EA refused. The UFC then turned to developer THQ to develop UFC titles. THQ's UFC 2009 Undisputed shipped approximately 2 million copies. With the success of the series, THQ quickly began working on a sequel, UFC Undisputed 2010, and followed this release with UFC Undisputed 3 in 2012.

With the growing popularity of MMA (the UFC banner particularly) and THQ's success, Electronic Arts began working on EA Sports MMA, featuring UFC's then promotional rival, Strikeforce. After the closing of THQ, Electronic Arts announced a "multi-year, multi-product" partnership with the Ultimate Fighting Championship at the Electronic Entertainment Expo 2012. THQ reported that the publishing rights were purchased by EA Sports for an "undisclosed cash payment". The first gameplay for the game was shown at the Xbox One reveal event in a trailer by EA Sports. The game is one of the first to run Electronic Arts's Ignite engine.

As a result of the new project, Electronic Arts put its Fight Night boxing franchise on hold. The company said that the decision was based primarily on its perception that the UFC has greater international prominence, although EA Sports did offer that the boxing series could potentially return. The Fight Night team (EA Canada) became the UFC team.

Roster
The roster was gradually revealed by EA Sports in batches. The final roster consists of 97 UFC fighters (not including DLC additions). UFC legend Royce Gracie and late martial arts icon Bruce Lee are both featured in the game as bonus unlockable fighters. Gracie is playable in the middleweight division, and Lee is playable in bantamweight, featherweight, lightweight and welterweight. A free content update was released for download on July 22, 2014, adding T.J. Dillashaw, Tyron Woodley and Takeya Mizugaki to the roster. On August 26, 2014, EA released another patch that included heavyweight Stipe Miocic as well as welterweights Matt Brown and Mike Pyle. On October 2, EA released their third patch including Tim Kennedy and Gunnar Nelson, and also making Nick Diaz able to switch to the middleweight division.  On October 29, EA released their fourth patch including Hector Lombard, Diego Sanchez and Michael Chiesa, and also making Gegard Mousasi able to switch to the middleweight division.  On November 19, EA released a fifth patch, this one including Myles Jury, Andrei Arlovski, and Yoel Romero. On December 10, EA released a legends pack, which included Mark Coleman, Matt Hughes, Quinton Jackson and Brock Lesnar. On January 21, EA released a seventh patch, this one including Eddie Alvarez, Holly Holm, Rafael dos Anjos and Anthony Johnson. This was said to be the last major update as they began focusing on the sequel, which was released in spring 2016.

Reception

EA Sports UFC received "mixed or average" reviews, according to video game review aggregator Metacritic.

References

2014 video games
Video game franchises introduced in 2014
Electronic Arts franchises
EA Sports games
Android (operating system) games
IOS games
PlayStation 4 games
Ultimate Fighting Championship video games
Video games developed in Canada
Video games set in Brazil
Video games set in Canada
Video games set in California
Video games set in Chicago
Video games set in Los Angeles
Video games set in Montreal
Video games set in Nevada
Video games set in New Jersey
Video games set in New York City
Video games set in Texas
Video games set in Toronto
Xbox One games